Lady is an outdoor sculpture by Jan Zach, installed outside the Jordan Schnitzer Museum of Art, between Prince Lucien Campbell Hall and Condon Hall, on the University of Oregon campus in Eugene, Oregon, in the United States. The  painted steel sculpture was donated to the museum in 2014. It was commissioned by Inacio Peixoto, in memory of his wife, and marked Zach's final work. The sculpture was a work in progress when Zach died in 1986, but his former student Jerry Harpster was able to fabricate Zach's original vision.

References

Outdoor sculptures in Eugene, Oregon
Steel sculptures in Oregon
University of Oregon campus